The 2014–15 B Group was the 60th season of the Bulgarian B Football Group, the second tier of the Bulgarian football league system.

Team changes from 2013–14

Movement between A PFG and B PFG
At the end of last season the first two teams of the second division of Bulgarian football were promoted to the top division - A PFG. These were Marek Dupnitsa and Haskovo 2009.

Because of the changes made in the number of teams in A PFG for this season the bottom four teams in A Group at the end of the last one were relegated to B Group for season 2014–2015. These were Chernomorets Burgas, Neftochimic Burgas, Pirin Gotse Delchev and Lyubimets 2007.

Movement between B PFG and V AFG
The four V AFG champions - Sozopol (South-East), Benkovski Byala (North-East), Pirin Blagoevgrad (South-West) and Lokomotiv Mezdra (North-West) - were promoted to B PFG because of their standings in their respective groups the previous season.

Further pre-season changes
On June 16 Benkovski Byala sent an official letter to the Bulgarian Football Union and declined to participate in the 2014–15 B PFG, citing financial problems. On the next day media reports suggested that three additional clubs had not met the license criteria in the initial investigation by the BFU - Lyubimets, Neftochimic and Pirin Gotse Delchev. All three clubs were in danger of being refused a spot in the group, while the 2nd placed teams in the 2013/14 V AFG were preparing themselves to make bids to replace them.

On June 19 the BFU confirmed Benkovski's withdrawal and officially invited FC Master Burgas to take their spot as the 2nd placed team in the Southeast V AFG. On June 22, the club announced it had accepted the invitation, and in addition would change its name to FC Burgas and switch colours from red and white to blue and white. On June 30, the BFU announced the final list of participants for the 2014–15 season after a six-hour session. Lyubimets, Neftochimic and Pirin Gotse Delchev were all denied a professional license for the following season due to outstanding debts and would have to compete in the V AFG or fold. The group was kept at 16 teams with the addition of Lokomotiv Gorna Oryahovitsa (2nd place in Northwest V AFG), Septemvri Simitli (2nd place in Southwest V AFG) and Vereya Stara Zagora (3rd place in Southeast V AFG). Vereya was chosen ahead of Oborishte Panagyurishte (3rd placed in Southwest V AFG) because of its higher coefficient and better infrastructure.

Stadia and locations

League table

Results

Season statistics

Top scorers

Updated on 24 May 2015

References 

2014-15
Bul
2